Rita Tveiten (born 22 January 1954, in Bergen) is a Norwegian politician for the Labour Party.

She was elected to the Norwegian Parliament from Hordaland in 1993, and was re-elected on one occasion. She served as a deputy representative during the terms 1989–1993 and 2001–2005. Three years into the second term as deputy, she replaced the regular representative Leif Lund who died.

Tveiten was a member of Osterøy municipality council from 1983 to 1987. During this term she was also a member of Hordaland county council.

References

1954 births
Living people
Labour Party (Norway) politicians
Members of the Storting
Politicians from Bergen
BI Norwegian Business School alumni
Norwegian School of Economics alumni
Women members of the Storting
Osterøy
21st-century Norwegian politicians
21st-century Norwegian women politicians
20th-century Norwegian politicians
20th-century Norwegian women politicians